Irish composer John Field was the first composer to use the term 'Nocturne' in the Romantic sense, to apply to a character piece featuring a cantabile melody over an arpeggiated accompaniment. He has been widely credited as the inventor of the genre, yet other composers were writing music in a similar style at this time, notably Hélène de Montgeroult in her Etude No. 110. Montgeroult's etude could not have been written later than 1812, the same year that John Field's Nocturnes were published.

List of works
There is no congruent historic numbering for the nocturnes. This list is arranged according to Hopkinson numbers, introduced in the 1961 catalogue by Cecil Hopkinson.

 H 24 – Nocturne for piano No. 1 in E-flat major – 1812
 H 25 – Nocturne for piano No. 2 in C minor – 1812
 H 26 – Nocturne for piano No. 3 in A-flat major – 1812
 H 36 – Nocturne for piano No. 4 in A major – 1817
 H 37 – Nocturne for piano No. 5 in B-flat major – 1817
 H 40 – Nocturne for piano No. 6 "Cradle Song" in F major – 1817
 H 45 – Nocturne for piano No. 7 "Reverie" in C major – 1821
 H 46 – Nocturne for piano No. 8 in E minor – 1821
 H 14E – Nocturne for piano No. 9 "Pastorale" in A major
 H 30A – Nocturne for piano No. 10 "Romance" in E-flat major – 1816
 H 56 – Nocturne for piano No. 11 in E-flat major – 1832
 H 58D – Nocturne for piano No. 12 in G major – 1822
 H 59 – Nocturne for piano No. 13 "Song without Words" in D minor – 1834
 H 60 – Nocturne for piano No. 14 in C major – 1835
 H 61 – Nocturne for piano No. 15 in C major – 1836
 H 62 – Nocturne for piano No. 16 in F major – 1836
 H 54 – Nocturne for piano [No. 17] "Grande Pastorale" in E major – (two different versions)
 H 13K – Nocturne for piano [No. 18] "Noontide" in E major

Additional nocturnes:

 H 55 – Nocturne for piano "The Troubadour" in C major
 H 63 – Nocturne for piano in B-flat major – op. posth.
 H 66 – Nocturne "Dernière pensèe"

See also 
 Nocturne

Sources
 Cecil Hopkinson, 'A Bibliographical Thematic Catalogue of the Works of John Field, 1782–1837' (London, 1961)

Compositions by John Field
Classical music in Ireland
Compositions for solo piano
Field